Ronald Gerard Connors (November 1, 1915 – November 27, 2002) was an American-born bishop in the Catholic Church. He was the second bishop of the Diocese of San Juan de la Maguana in the Dominican Republic from 1977–1991.

Biography
Connors was born in Brooklyn, New York. He professed religious vows in the Congregation of the Most Holy Redeemer, more commonly known as the Redemptorists, and was ordained a priest on June 22, 1941.

Pope Paul VI named Connors Titular Bishop of Equizetum and Coadjutor Bishop of San Juan de la Maguana on April 24, 1976. He was consecrated on July 20, 1976 by Cardinal Octavio Beras Rojas the Archbishop of Santo Domingo. The principal co-consecrators were Bishops Tomás Francisco Reilly, of San Juan de la Maguana and Edwin Broderick, of Albany, New York. He succeeded to the See of San Juan de la Maguana on July 20, 1977 and served the diocese as a bishop for a total of 15 years. His resignation was accepted by Pope John Paul II on February 20, 1991. He died at the age of 87 in 2002.

References

1915 births
2002 deaths
People from Brooklyn
Redemptorist bishops
20th-century Roman Catholic bishops in the Dominican Republic
American Roman Catholic missionaries
Roman Catholic missionaries in the Dominican Republic
American expatriates in the Dominican Republic
Catholics from New York (state)
Roman Catholic bishops of San Juan de la Maguana